Muhammad Fajur Rahim is an Indian politician and member of the Manipur Legislative Assembly representing Wabgai. He was elected in 2017 as a candidate of the Indian National Congress. He was one of three Muslim candidates elected to the Manipur Legislative Assembly in 2017.

References 

Living people
Indian National Congress politicians from Manipur
Manipur politicians
Manipur MLAs 2017–2022
Year of birth missing (living people)